Jack Leslie (born 27 April 1995) is a professional Australian rules footballer who played for the Gold Coast Football Club in the Australian Football League (AFL). He was recruited by Gold Coast with the 20th overall selection in the 2013 national draft. He now plays for Williamstown Football Club in the Victorian Football League (VFL).

AFL career
Leslie made his AFL debut against Essendon in round 22 of the 2014 season. He got the late call up after Daniel Gorringe withdrew. Leslie kept his spot for the following round against West Coast.

References

External links

 

1995 births
Australian rules footballers from Victoria (Australia)
Gold Coast Football Club players
Gippsland Power players
Living people
Williamstown Football Club players